Beach Patrol is a 1979 American made-for-television crime drama film originally aired on ABC. It stars Robin Strand, Jonathan Frakes, and Christie DeLisle.

The film was a pilot for a television series that did not sell but which still screened as a standalone film.

Cast
Robin Strand as Russ Patrick
Jonathan Frakes as Marty Green
Christine DeLisle as Jan Plummer
Rick Hill as Earl 'Hack' Hackman
Michael Gregory as Sgt. Lou Markowski
Paul Burke as Wes Dobbs
Michael V. Gazzo as Banker
Panchito Gómez as Wild boy
Mimi Maynard as Wanda
Princess O'Mahoney as Tall girl
Lillian Adams as Older lady 
Bella Bruck as Older lady 
X Brands as Officer 
Georgie Paul as Nurse 
Susanne Severeid as Surfer girl

References

External links

1979 television films
1979 films
1979 crime drama films
American crime drama films
ABC network original films
Films produced by Aaron Spelling
Films scored by Barry De Vorzon
Television films as pilots
Television pilots not picked up as a series
Films directed by Bob Kelljan
American drama television films
1970s American films